{{Speciesbox
|name=Central Ranges wattle|image =
|genus = Acacia
|species = tenuior
|authority = Maiden
|range_map = 
|range_map_caption = Occurrence data from AVH
}}Acacia tenuior, commonly known as Central Ranges wattle', is a shrub of the genus Acacia and the subgenus Plurinerves that is endemic to a small area in central Australia. It is considered to be rare in South Australia.

Description
Like most species of Acacia'' it has phyllodes rather than true leaves. When it blooms it produces simple inflorescences that occur singly or in pairs in the axils that have spherical flower-heads containing 25 to 30 yellow coloured flowers.

Distribution
It is native to a small and scattered area in north western South Australia and south eastern Northern Territory including in the Musgrave Ranges including Ngarutjaranya and Jacky's Pass where the type specimen was collected by Herbert Basedow in 1903 and the Mann Ranges form around Mount Mann and usually at altitudes of about  The shrubs are usually situated on areas of granite or gneiss often in gully heads and along drainage lines and usually along the southern sides of the slopes and in fire shadow areas.

See also
List of Acacia species

References

tenuior
Flora of South Australia
Taxa named by Joseph Maiden
Plants described in 1920